Manufactured in Germany between 1924 and 1928, the Agon line of motorcycles featured a wide range of engine sizes from 173cc up to 996cc from engine manufacturers such as Paque, Bradshaw and JAP.

References

Motorcycle manufacturers of Germany